Blutzbrüdaz is a 2011 German musical film, directed by German-Turkish Özgür Yildirim. The film was nominated at the 2012 New Faces Awards in Germany.

Plot

Cast

Development

Soundtrack
The soundtrack Blutzbrüdaz – die Mukke zum Film was released in December 2011.

References

External links

Official Website 

2011 films
German musical films
Films set in Berlin
2010s musical films
2010s German films